The 2008 Big West Conference men's basketball tournament took place from March 12–15, 2008 at the Anaheim Convention Center Arena in Anaheim, California. The quarterfinals were televised by KVMD, the semifinals were televised by ESPNU, and the Big West Conference Championship Game was televised by ESPN2.

Seeds
There was a three-way tie for first place during the regular season. UCSB received the #1 seed due to a 3–1 record against Cal State Northridge and Cal State Fullerton. Cal State Northridge received the #2 seed due to a 2–2 record against UCSB and Cal State Fullerton.

Format
The top two seed receive byes into the semifinals. Seeds 3 and 4 receive byes into the quarterfinals. If necessary, the bracket will be adjusted after each round so that the top and bottom seeds in each round play in the same game. The ninth place team, UC Davis, did not receive a tournament invitation.

Bracket

References

External links
2008 Tournament Bracket

Big West Conference men's basketball tournament
Tournament
Big West Conference men's basketball tournament
Big West Conference men's basketball tournament